was a town located in Nishikasugai District, Aichi Prefecture, Japan.

As of 2003, the town had an estimated population of 19,409 and a density of 3,696.95 persons per km2. The total area was 5.25 km2.

On July 7, 2005, Kiyosu absorbed the towns of Nishibiwajima and Shinkawa (all from Nishikasugai District) to create the city of Kiyosu.

Famed manga artist Akira Toriyama, creator of Dragon Ball, lives in Kiyosu.

External links
City of Kiyosu official website 

Dissolved municipalities of Aichi Prefecture
Kiyosu, Aichi

de:Kiyosu